This is a compilation of Korean artists whose work is in three-dimensional materials, such as potters, other ceramic artists, and sculptors.

Contemporary Ceramic Artists 
See also Korean Pottery and Porcelain and Korean Art.
Yu Geun-Hyeong (b. 1894 d. 1993)
Hwang, Jong Koo (b. 1919 d. 2003) 
Whang, Chong Nye (b. 1927) 
Kwon, Soon Hyung (b. 1929) 
Kim, Kee Chul (b. 1935) 
Cho, Chung Hyun (b. 1940) 
Yoon, Kwang cho (Yoon, Kwang Jo) (b. 1946) 
Yoo, Byung Ho (b. 1947) 
Kim, Yik Yung  (b. 1935)
Cho Ki-Jung (1939-2007)
Shin, Sang Ho (b. 1947)

References:

 Korean Ceramics Today. Korea-Britain Centennial Committee, 1983
Contemporary Korean Ceramics: Survey of Current Works. Grossmont College, 1993
From the Fire: A survey of contemporary Korean ceramics. International Arts & Artists, 2004

References

Ceramic
Ceramic

Korean